Brian Alejandro Rubio Rodríguez (born 9 November 1996) is a Mexican professional footballer who plays as a forward for Liga MX club León, on loan from Mazatlán.

Career statistics

Club

References

External links
 
 
 

Living people
1996 births
Mexican footballers
Footballers from Guadalajara, Jalisco
Association football forwards
C.S. Herediano footballers
Deportivo Toluca F.C. players
FC Juárez footballers
Liga MX players
Liga FPD players
Liga Premier de México players
Mazatlán F.C. footballers
Mexican expatriate footballers
Mexican expatriate sportspeople in Costa Rica
Expatriate footballers in Costa Rica